GNU adns is a C library that provides easy-to-use DNS resolution functionality. The library is asynchronous, allowing several concurrent calls. The package also includes several command-line utilities for use in scripts.

External links 
 adns - advanced, alternative, asynchronous resolver

C (programming language) libraries
GNU Project software